A Capital Development Authority is a kind of entity found in various countries that is concerned with the municipal development of the capital city or capital territory of that country. Examples include:

Capital Development Authority (Islamabad): the Capital Development Authority of Islamabad, the capital of Pakistan
Capital Development Authority (Dodoma): the Capital Development Authority of Dodoma, the capital of Tanzania, 
Rajdhani Unnayan Kartripakkha, or RAJUK, the Capital Development Authority of Dhaka, the capital of Bangladesh
Federal Capital Development Authority of Abuja, the capital of Nigeria